Yellow & Green is an album by bassist Ron Carter recorded at Van Gelder Studio in New Jersey in 1976 and released on the CTI label.

Reception

Allmusic reviewer Jim Todd calls the album "A low point for bassist Ron Carter, this aimless set suffers from the malaise that hit the jazz scene after the fusion boom of the late '60s and early '70s... An episode best forgotten".

Track listing
All compositions by Ron Carter except where noted
 "Tenaj" - 7:44 
 "Receipt, Please" - 7:05 
 "Willow Weep for Me" (Ann Ronell) - 2:40 
 "Yellow and Green" - 6:13 
 "Opus 15" - 6:55 
 "Epistrophy" (Kenny Clarke, Thelonious Monk) - 6:07

Personnel
Ron Carter - bass, piccolo bass, cowbell, tambourine
Kenny Barron - piano (track 1, 5 & 6)
Don Grolnick - piano, electric piano (track 2 & 4) 
Hugh McCracken - guitar, harmonica (tracks 1, 2, 4 & 5)
Billy Cobham (tracks 1, 2, 4 & 5), Ben Riley (track 6) - drums
Dom Um Romão - percussion (tracks 2 & 5)

References

1976 albums
CTI Records albums
Ron Carter albums
Albums produced by Creed Taylor
Albums recorded at Van Gelder Studio